Sheva Brachot literally "the seven blessings" also known as birkot nissuin, "the wedding blessings" in Jewish law are blessings that are recited for a bride and her groom as part of nissuin. In Jewish marriages there are two stages: betrothal (erusin) and establishing the full marriage (nissuin). Historically there was a year between the two events, but in modern marriages, the two are combined as a single wedding ceremony.

Though the Sheva Brachot are a stylistically harmonious whole, they are actually a mosaic of interwoven Biblical words, phrases and ideas. It is not certain who composed the benedictions; the text is recorded in the Talmud, but its origin is probably several centuries earlier.

Occasion

In the seventh century, it was traditional for the blessings to be said at the groom's house, and at the house where the bride had spent the night previous to the marriage; this is still the tradition among Jews in some parts of Asia, but in most regions the wedding blessings are now recited towards the end of the formal marriage ceremony, under the Chuppah. 

These blessing are also recited as part of the week-long festivities celebrating the wedding; in most communities these festive meals occur during the week after the wedding, but among the Mountain Jews they occur during the week before it. Under the chuppah the blessing over wine comes first; at the meal table it comes last, after the Grace After Meals. If both the bride and the groom were previously married the post wedding celebrations are limited to three days, not seven. In such a case, the blessings are recited only after the very first festive meal, which should take place right after the wedding.

In Orthodox Judaism, the first six of the blessings are said only if a religiously valid quorum is present. On weekdays their recitation also requires the presence of at least one person who was not present for any of the previous Sheva Brachot of the couple. At the two main meals on Shabbat (but not at Seuda Shelishit) there is no need for a new guest, since the Shabbat itself is considered a new guest. New guests are referred to as new faces (Hebrew: פנים חדשות).

Old Yemenite Jewish custom

The old Yemenite Jewish custom regarding the Sheva Brachot is recorded in Rabbi Yihya Saleh's (Maharitz) Responsa. The custom that was prevalent in Sana'a before the Exile of Mawza was to say the Sheva Brachot for the bridegroom and bride on a Friday morning, following the couple's wedding the day before, even though she had not slept in the house of her newly wedded husband. In Yemenite custom, the bride was brought to her husband's house only on the following day of their wedding. On Friday (Sabbath eve) they would pitch a large tent within a garden called al-Jowzah, replete with pillows and cushions, and there, on the next day (Sabbath afternoon), they would repeat the seven benedictions for the bridegroom and bride, followed by prayer inside the tent, before they were dismissed to eat of their third Sabbath meal, at which time some accompanied the bridegroom to his own house to eat with him there. The significance of this practice, according to Maharitz, was that they made the seven blessings even when not actually eating in that place, a practice which differs from today's custom.

Performance

It is a common custom for these blessings to be pronounced by a Hazzan or Rabbi, if they presided over the marriage, or otherwise for pronunciation of the blessings to be divided among honoured guests. Sometimes, the blessings are sung by the wedding guests en-masse. 

The blessings are usually said over a cup of wine. If multiple people say the blessings, the cup is passed to the person pronouncing each blessing. In many traditions, when a person pronounces the blessing, they and/or the groom drinks from the cup, either after each blessing, or just after all seven.

The wording

The text for Sheva B'rachot varies between Sephardic and Azhkenazic Jews, but may even vary from community to community. The standardized Ashkenazic is below, with an Egyptian Sephardic textual variant being inserted in parenthesis.

See also
 Jewish view of marriage
 List of Jewish prayers and blessings

References

External links
 Why Get Married - A Lesson in Seven Blessings by Mois Navon
 Sheva Brachot Guide
 Cantorial Performance of the Brachot

Jewish marital law
Hebrew words and phrases in Jewish law
Hebrew words and phrases in Jewish prayers and blessings